The St. John's Hindu Temple is located in St. John's, Newfoundland and Labrador, Canada. In 1975 Hindus established a Hindu temple in Mount Pearl, Swami Chinmayananda donated a marble statue of Krishna which was installed by Swami Dayananda. The temple functioned as an independent organization with the name Chinmaya Mission St. John's.

In 1995, a new temple was constructed in the east end of St. John's where most Hindus live, and subsequently it was renamed Hindu Temple St. John's Association.

All major Hindu festivals are celebrated in this temple. The temple participates in several local ethno-cultural and community projects and events.  Children perform a weekly puja on Sunday mornings, and the temple is regularly visited by other groups of school children.

Main deity at the Temple

Krishna

Festivals celebrated during the year

Navratri - Golu, Garba and Durga Pooja
Diwali
Maha Shivaratri
Ganesh Chathurthi
Makar Sankranti Pongal
Holi
Krishna Janmashtami
Onam
New Year festivities in April, Ramanavami

See also

 Architecture of St. John's
 World Hinduism
 Hindu calendar
 List of Hindu temples
 Hindu scriptures

Notes

References
 Antaya-Moore, D, Kostelyk, A and Badley,K (2004) Who Am I?: A Teacher's Guide. Chapter 3. Thomson Canada (Nelson). 
 Breakwater Books (2002) Directions: Faiths of Friend Series: Book 2. Pages 47–54. St. John's.

External links
 http://www.arts.mun.ca/localreligions/profiles/hindu_temple.html

Religious organizations established in 1975
Hindu temples in Canada
Buildings and structures in St. John's, Newfoundland and Labrador
Krishna temples